The Treaty of Frankfurt was signed on 22 July 1489 at Frankfurt between Maximilian of Austria and the envoys of King Charles VIII of France. Based on the terms of the peace agreement, King Charles agreed to promote reconciliation between Maximilian and the Flemish rebels. Moreover, he surrendered the French-occupied towns in Brittany to Duchess Anne of Brittany on the condition that Duchess Anne remove all English forces from the duchy.

See also
List of treaties

References

Sources
Currin, [[John M. Persuasions]] to Peace: The Luxembourg-Marigny-Gaguin Embassy and the State of Anglo-French Relations, 1489–90. The English Historical Review. Oxford University Press, 1998.

Further reading
Dumont, Jean. Corps universel diplomatique du droit de gens (8 volumes). Amsterdam, 1726–1737.
Plancher, Urban. Histoire générale et particulière de Bourgogne (3 volumes). Dijon, 1739–1781.

1480s in the Holy Roman Empire
1489 in Europe
1480s in France
1480s treaties
Frankfurt (1489)
Frankfurt (1489)
1480s in the Burgundian Netherlands